The Bar C Mystery is a 1926 American silent Western film serial directed by Robert F. Hill. It is now considered to be lost.

Cast
 Dorothy Phillips as Jane Cortelyou
 Wallace MacDonald as Nevada
 Ethel Clayton as Mrs. Lane
 Philo McCullough as Robbins
 Johnny Fox as Tommy
 Violet Schram as Wanda
 Fred DeSilva as Grisp
 Julie Bishop (as Jacqueline Wells)
 Billy Bletcher
 Jim Corey
 Al Hart
 Fred Kohler
 Tom London
 Francis McDonald
 Victor Potel

See also
 List of American films of 1926
 List of film serials
 List of film serials by studio
 List of lost films

References

External links
 
 The Bar-C Mystery at SilentEra

1926 films
1926 Western (genre) films
1926 short films
1926 lost films
American silent serial films
American black-and-white films
Pathé Exchange film serials
Films directed by Robert F. Hill
Lost Western (genre) films
Lost American films
Silent American Western (genre) films
1920s American films
1920s English-language films